George Moultrie Napier (March 28, 1863 – May 4, 1932) was an Attorney General of  Georgia (1921–1932) and a Grand Master of the Freemasons (1911–1912).

Born in Walker County, Georgia, Napier attended the public schools of his home county, and received an A.B. from North Georgia Agricultural College in 1882. He moved to Monroe, Georgia, and worked for a time as a newspaper editor and a court reporter, also reading law during this time before receiving an M.A. from the University of Georgia in 1898. He then served in the Spanish–American War, after which he relocated to Atlanta, Georgia, to practice law.

Napier died from a stroke while having breakfast in his home, at the age of 69.

References

Georgia (U.S. state) Attorneys General
1932 deaths
1863 births
University of North Georgia alumni
University of Georgia alumni